The Harvard Law Review is a law review published by an independent student group at Harvard Law School. According to the Journal Citation Reports, the Harvard Law Reviews 2015 impact factor of 4.979 placed the journal first out of 143 journals in the category "Law". It is published monthly from November through June, with the November issue dedicated to covering the previous year's term of the Supreme Court of the United States. The journal also publishes the online-only Harvard Law Review Forum, a rolling journal of scholarly responses to the main journal's content. The law review is one of three honors societies at the law school, along with the Harvard Legal Aid Bureau and the Board of Student Advisors. Students who are selected for more than one of these three organizations may only join one.

The Harvard Law Review Association, in conjunction with the Columbia Law Review, the University of Pennsylvania Law Review, and the Yale Law Journal, publishes the Bluebook: A Uniform System of Citation, a widely followed authority for legal citation formats in the United States.

History
The Harvard Law Review published its first issue on April 15, 1887, making it one of the oldest operating student-edited law reviews in the United States. The establishment of the journal was largely due to the support of Louis Brandeis, then a recent Harvard Law School alumnus and Boston attorney who would later go on to become a Justice of the Supreme Court of the United States.

From the 1880s to the 1970s, editors were selected on the basis of their grades; the president of the Review was the student with the highest academic rank.  The first female editor of the journal was Priscilla Holmes (1953-1955, Volumes 67-68); the first woman to serve as the journal's president was Susan Estrich (1977), who later was active in Democratic Party politics and became the youngest woman to receive tenure at Harvard Law School; its first non-white ethnic minority president was Raj Marphatia (1988, Volume 101), who is now a partner at the Boston law firm of Ropes & Gray; its first African-American president was the 44th President of the United States Barack Obama (1991); its first openly gay president was Mitchell Reich (2011); its first Latino president was Andrew M. Crespo, who is now tenured as a professor at Harvard Law School. The first female African-American president, ImeIme Umana, was elected in 2017.

Gannett House, a white building constructed in the Greek Revival style that was popular in New England during the mid-to-late 19th century, has been home to the Harvard Law Review since the 1920s. Before moving into Gannett House, the journal resided in the Law School's Austin Hall.

Since the change of criteria in the 1970s, grades are no longer the primary basis of selection for editors.  Membership in the Harvard Law Review is offered to select Harvard law students based on first-year grades and performance in a writing competition held at the end of the first year except for twelve slots that are offered on a discretionary basis. The writing competition includes two components: an edit of an unpublished article and an analysis of a recent United States Supreme Court or Court of Appeals case. The writing competition submissions are graded blindly to assure anonymity. Fourteen editors (two from each 1L section) are selected based on a combination of their first-year grades and their competition scores. Twenty editors are selected based solely on their competition scores. The remaining twelve editors are selected on a discretionary basis. According to the law review's webpage, "Some of these discretionary slots may be used to implement the Review's affirmative action policy." The president of the Harvard Law Review is elected by the other editors.

It has been a long tradition since the first issue that the works of students published in the Harvard Law Review are called "notes" and they are unsigned as part of a policy reflecting "the fact that many members of the Review besides the author make a contribution to each published piece."

In 2012, Harvard Law Review had 1,722 paid subscriptions.

Alumni
 
Prominent alumni of the Harvard Law Review include:

President of the United States
 Barack Obama, served as president of volume 104

Supreme Court Justices
 Stephen Breyer, served as articles editor of volume 77
 Felix Frankfurter
 Ruth Bader Ginsburg, served as editor for one year before transferring to Columbia Law School
 Ketanji Brown Jackson, served as supervising editor of volume 109.
 Elena Kagan, served as supervising editor of volume 99
 John G. Roberts Jr., served as managing editor for volume 92
 Antonin Scalia, served as notes editor for volume 73
 Edward Sanford

Other jurists
 David J. Barron, judge of the United States Court of Appeals for the First Circuit, served as articles editor
 Andrew L. Brasher, judge of the United States Court of Appeals for the Eleventh Circuit
 Michael Boudin, judge of the United States Court of Appeals for the First Circuit, served as president of volume 77
 Henry Friendly, late judge of the United States Court of Appeals for the Second Circuit, served as president
 Learned Hand, late judge of the United States Court of Appeals for the Second Circuit, served as an editor but later resigned.
 Harris Hartz, judge of the United States Court of Appeals for the Tenth Circuit, served as case and developments editor
 Gregory G. Katsas, judge of the United States Court of Appeals for the District of Columbia Circuit, executive editor of volume 102.
 William Kayatta, judge of the United States Court of Appeals for the First Circuit
 Pierre Leval, judge of the United States Court of Appeals for the Second Circuit, served as notes editor
 Debra Ann Livingston, judge of the United States Court of Appeals for the Second Circuit
 James Kenneth Logan, judge of the United States Court of Appeals for the Tenth Circuit
 Kevin C. Newsom, judge of the United States Court of Appeals for the Eleventh Circuit, articles editor of volume 110.
 James L. Oakes, late judge of the United States Court of Appeals for the Second Circuit
 Nina Pillard, judge of the United States Court of Appeals for the District of Columbia Circuit
 Richard Posner, judge of the United States Court of Appeals for the Seventh Circuit, served as president of volume 75
 Lawrence VanDyke, judge of the United States Court of Appeals for the Ninth Circuit.

Cabinet secretaries
 Dean Acheson, Secretary of State
 Michael Chertoff, Secretary of Homeland Security and former judge on United States Court of Appeals for the Third Circuit
 William Coleman Jr., Secretary of Transportation, Brown v. Board of Education attorney, and first African-American Supreme Court clerk
 Merrick Garland, 86th United States Attorney General; Judge of the United States Court of Appeals for the District of Columbia Circuit, served as articles editor
 Mike Pompeo, former US Secretary of State
 Elliot Richardson, Attorney General, Secretary of Health, Education, and Welfare, Secretary of Defense, Secretary of Commerce, served as president (1947)

Other U.S. government officials
 Paul Clement, former U.S. Solicitor General, served as Supreme Court editor
 Archibald Cox, late U.S. Solicitor General
 Christopher Cox, former chairman of U.S. Securities and Exchange Commission
 Ted Cruz, U.S. Senator from Texas
 Viet Dinh, former Assistant Attorney General, served as Bluebook editor
 Charles Evans Hughes Jr., former U.S. Solicitor General
 Michael Froman, U.S. Trade Representative
 Julius Genachowski, former chairman of the Federal Communications Commission
 Ian Gershengorn, former acting U.S. Solicitor General
 Danielle Gray, former Cabinet Secretary
 Erwin N. Griswold, a dean of the Harvard Law School and Solicitor General under presidents Lyndon B. Johnson and Richard M. Nixon
 Alger Hiss, former U.S. State Department official and alleged spy
 Ron Klain, Chief of staff to Vice Presidents Al Gore and  Joe Biden, Chief of Staff to the 46th president of the United States Joe Biden 
 Christopher Landau, former United States Ambassador to Mexico, served as articles editor 
 Michael Leiter, former Director of the U.S. National Counterterrorism Center, president of volume 113
 Mark S. Martins, Brigadier General in the United States Army Judge Advocate General's Corps, Chief Prosecutor of Military Commissions
 Bernard Nussbaum, former White House Counsel, served as notes editor
 F. Whitten Peters, former Secretary of the Air Force, served as president
 Edith Ramirez, chairwoman of the Federal Trade Commission
 Rod Rosenstein,  U.S. Deputy Attorney General
 Jamie Raskin, U.S. Representative from Maryland
 Robert A. Taft, U.S. Senator from Ohio
 Barry B. White, former United States Ambassador to Norway
 Robert L. Deitz, former General Counsel for the National Security Agency and Senior Counsel to the Director of the Central Intelligence Agency, served as notes editor and Supreme Court Note.

Other government officials
 Preeta D. Bansal, former New York State Solicitor General, served as supervising editor
 Allan Gotlieb, former Canadian Ambassador to the United States
 Eliot Spitzer, former Governor of New York
 Robert Stanfield, former Premier of the Province of Nova Scotia, and former leader of Canada's Official Opposition. He was the Review's first Canadian editor in the late 1930s.

Academics
 Stephen Barnett, legal scholar at University of California, Berkeley School of Law who opposed the Newspaper Preservation Act of 1970
 Alexander Bickel, late professor at Yale Law School
 Derek Bok, former president of Harvard University
 Deborah Brake, Associate Dean for Research and Faculty Development, John E. Murray Faculty Scholar and Professor of Law at the University of Pittsburgh
 Kingman Brewster, former president of Yale University, served as treasurer
 Amy Chua, professor at Yale Law School, served as executive editor
 Stephen J. Friedman, president of Pace University
 John H. Garvey, president of The Catholic University of America
 I. Glenn Cohen, professor at Harvard Law School.
 Annette Gordon-Reed, professor at Harvard Law School and winner of the Pulitzer Prize for History
 Robert A. Gorman (born 1937), law professor at the University of Pennsylvania Law School
 Charles Hamilton Houston, former Dean of Howard University Law School and NAACP Litigation Director
 Wesley Newcomb Hohfeld, professor at Yale Law School
John Honnold (1915-2011), law professor at the University of Pennsylvania Law School
 Harold Koh, former Dean of Yale Law School
 David Leebron, president of Rice University, served as president
 Lance Liebman, former Dean of Columbia Law School, served as president
 Kenneth Mack, professor and historian at Harvard Law School.
 William C. Powers, former president of University of Texas, served as managing editor
Stephen Schulhofer (born 1942), professor of law at the University of Pennsylvania Law School and NYU Law School
 John Sexton, former president of New York University
 James Vorenberg, former dean of Harvard Law School, served as president
 Michael K. Young, president of Texas A&M University

Other attorneys
Bennett Boskey, law clerk to Judge Learned Hand and two U.S. Supreme Court justices
Joe Flom, noted M&A attorney and name partner at Skadden, Arps, Slate, Meagher & Flom
John B. Quinn, founder and name partner of Quinn Emanuel Urquhart & Sullivan

Writers and journalists
 Phil Graham, former publisher of The Washington Post
 Archibald MacLeish, Pulitzer Prize-winning poet
 Cliff Sloan, former publisher of Slate
 Jeffrey Toobin, print and broadcast journalist

Other alumni
 David Bonderman, co-founder of private equity firm TPG Capital
 Norman Dorsen, former American Civil Liberties Union president
 Jeff Kindler, former CEO of Pfizer
 Alfred Lee Loomis, financier, scientist, and inventor
 Rob Manfred, commissioner of Major League Baseball, served as articles editor
 Adebayo Ogunlesi, chairman and managing partner of Global Infrastructure Partners
 Nadine Strossen, former American Civil Liberties Union president

See also
 Harvard Law Record
 Hart–Fuller debate

References

External links
 

American law journals
General law journals
Harvard Law School
Harvard University academic journals
Publications established in 1887
English-language journals
Law journals edited by students
1887 establishments in Massachusetts
8 times per year journals